The 1931 Harvard Crimson football team represented Harvard University as an independent during the 1931 college football season. In its first season under head coach Eddie Casey, Harvard compiled a 7–1 record and outscored opponents by a total of 149 to 29. Barry Wood was the team captain. The team played its home games at Harvard Stadium in Boston.

Schedule

References

Harvard
Harvard Crimson football seasons
Harvard Crimson football
1930s in Boston